Tia Hellebaut (born 16 February 1978 in Antwerp) is a retired Belgian track and field athlete, as well as a chemist, who started out in her sports career in the heptathlon, and afterwards specialized in the high jump event. She has cleared 2.05 metres both indoors and outdoors.

Hellebaut was the 2008 Olympic champion in the high jump. She was previously the European Champion in 2006 and then the European Indoor Champion in 2007. She won the gold medal in the pentathlon at the 2008 IAAF World Indoor Championships. In addition to these medals, she has participated at the World Championships in Athletics on four occasions.

She held the Belgian records indoor long jump and indoor pentathlon until they were broken by Nafissatou Thiam and still holds the Belgian record in both indoors and outdoors high jump.

Career
Hellebaut started as a professional athlete with Atletiek Vlaanderen in the period from 2001 to October 2005. From 1 November 2006 she again became a professional athlete, this time at Bloso. During her most successful period, Hellebaut was trained by her partner, Wim Vandeven, at her club, Atletica 84.

At the 2006 European Championships and 2007 Indoor European Championships Hellebaut won the gold medal in high jump. The 2006 victory became especially notable, when just a couple of minutes later her close friend and compatriot Kim Gevaert completed a historical sprint double. The images of both athletes celebrating their victory together, wrapped in a national flag, became part of Belgian sports history.

In 2007 Hellebaut set the then fourth best pentathlon score of all time, but chose not to contest the European Indoor Championships because of illness, choosing instead to compete only in the high jump, which she later won. Most of the remainder of her 2007 high jump season was hampered by an ankle injury. A shoulder injury, which made it difficult for her to throw the javelin, ended her career in heptathlon around this time.

For the 2008 indoor season, Hellebaut returned her focus to multi-events and became world champion of pentathlon at the World Indoor Championships in Valencia, where she set a record for the best high jump result in a women's multi-event competition, clearing 1.99 m.

At the 2008 Summer Olympics, held in Beijing, Hellebaut reached her pinnacle thus far by winning the gold medal in the high jump, ahead of the favorite, Blanka Vlašić of Croatia, with a new outdoor personal best of 2.05 m. Her achievement represented the first-ever athletics gold medal in the Olympics for a Belgian woman, and only the second of any color, one day after Belgium won their first (silver) medal in the 4 × 100 m relay (which later was upgraded to gold after the Russian team was disqualified because of a doping rules infraction by one of their athletes).

Retirement and comebacks
On 5 December 2008 Hellebaut announced her pregnancy and retirement from professional athletics and that she would start working for a sports marketing company. The following year, on 9 June, her daughter Lotte was born.

Inspired by fellow Belgian Kim Clijsters' comeback to the WTA as a young mother, she unexpectedly announced her return to athletics on 16 February 2010, her 32nd birthday. Hellebaut also announced that she would be concentrating exclusively on the high jump and aimed to participate in the 2012 Summer Olympics.

Shortly after placing fifth at the 2010 European Athletic Championships in Barcelona by clearing 1.97 metres, her first major championships after her comeback, it was reported that Hellebaut was pregnant again. During a press conference on 17 August she confirmed that she had been pregnant for three months already, and that this had been a conscious choice. Although Hellebaut did not participate in any further 2010 events, she never officially announced that the new pregnancy would definitively end her career.

On 16 June 2011, 4 months after the birth of her second daughter Saartje, Hellebaut announced her second return, confirming that she aimed to defend her title at the London Games. She was Team Belgium national flag bearer at the 2012 Summer Olympics Parade of Nations. She ended fifth in the high jump competition.

On 6 March 2013, after the European Indoor Championships in Gothenburg, she announced her second retirement, saying that she could no longer challenge herself mentally in competition.

Sport consultancy
In March 2019, Belgian football club Beerschot Wilrijk announced the take-over of amateur side Rupel Boom and lifetime Beerschot supporter Hellebaut was appointed advisor at Rupel Boom's football academy.

Honours 
 2009 : Dame Grand Cross of the Order of the Crown, by Royal Decree of H.M. King Albert II.

International achievements

Statistics

References

External links
Official website
Tia Hellebaut Interview

1978 births
Living people
Belgian heptathletes
Belgian female high jumpers
Flemish sportspeople
Sportspeople from Antwerp
Olympic athletes of Belgium
Athletes (track and field) at the 2004 Summer Olympics
Athletes (track and field) at the 2008 Summer Olympics
Olympic gold medalists for Belgium

Grand Crosses of the Order of the Crown (Belgium)
Athletes (track and field) at the 2012 Summer Olympics
Belgian sportswomen
European Athletics Championships medalists
Medalists at the 2008 Summer Olympics
Olympic gold medalists in athletics (track and field)
World Athletics Indoor Championships winners